Nurabad (also Romanized as Nūrābād; also known as Gow and Gūr) is a village in Geshmiran Rural District, in the Central District of Manujan County, Kerman Province, Iran. At the 2006 census, its population was 296, in 64 families.

References 

Populated places in Manujan County